Highway M07 is a Ukrainian international highway (M-highway) connecting Kyiv to Yahodyn on the border with Poland, where it continues into Poland as National Road 12 (DK12).

In Soviet times, the M07 was identified as A255. Today, the highway stretches through four oblasts and ends at the border checkpoint Yahodyn in Liuboml Raion (Volyn Oblast). The entire route is part of European route E373.

Route

Gallery

See also

 Roads in Ukraine
 Ukraine Highways
 International E-road network
 Pan-European corridors

References

External links
 International Roads in Ukraine in Russian
 European Roads in Russian

Roads in Volyn Oblast
Roads in Kyiv
Roads in Kyiv Oblast
Roads in Zhytomyr Oblast
Roads in Rivne Oblast